Pitcher Township is one of sixteen townships in Cherokee County, Iowa, USA.  As of the 2000 census, its population was 1,292.

Geography
According to the USGS, it contains one cemetery, Pleasant Hill.

Historical maps of Pitcher Township from 1923 and 1907 can be found on Historic Map Works.

References

External links
 US-Counties.com
 City-Data.com
 Historicmapworks.com

Townships in Cherokee County, Iowa
Townships in Iowa